Leptacris maxima is a species of grasshopper in the  family Acrididae and tribe Leptacrini. The scientific name of this species was first published in 1907 by Karny

References

External links
 
 

Acrididae